Chan Wai Kei (born 19 March 1981), also known as Vicky Chan, is a sailor from Hong Kong who won a silver medal at the 2006 Asian Games in the mistral class. She also competed in the windsurfing event at the 2008 Beijing Olympics, finishing in 9th position.

References

External links
 
 
 

1981 births
Living people
Hong Kong windsurfers
Female windsurfers
Hong Kong female sailors (sport)
Olympic sailors of Hong Kong
Sailors at the 2008 Summer Olympics – RS:X
Asian Games silver medalists for Hong Kong
Asian Games medalists in sailing
Sailors at the 2006 Asian Games
Sailors at the 2010 Asian Games
Medalists at the 2006 Asian Games
Medalists at the 2010 Asian Games
Place of birth missing (living people)